The 2019 Supercar Challenge powered by Hankook was the nineteenth Supercar Challenge season since it replaced the Supercar Cup in 2001. It began at Magny-Cours on April 19 and ended at TT Circuit Assen on October 20.

Calendar

Entry list

Race results

Drivers' championships

GT

Supersport

Sport

Notes

References

External links

2019 in motorsport
2019 in Dutch motorsport
2019 in European sport